This is a list of municipalities with available wired multiple-system ("triple play") broadband providers, often commonly known as cable franchise holders, or fiber to the premises providers.  As of 2015 Massachusetts had ten registered providers which served 308 communities (out of 351), with those 308 having at least one franchise provider.  It is estimated that these ten providers alone contributed roughly $3.5 billion dollars to the Commonwealth's economy in 2011.

A handful of municipal owned providers in the state also form a collective known as the Massachusetts Alliance for Municipal Electric Choice (MAMEC).

Notes 
 MAP, Cable Television Providers, by Municipality
 Status of communities as of November 2019
 Cable Television Licenses, Department of Telecommunications and Cable, (Massachusetts) Consumer Affairs & Business Regulation (OCABR) office.
 Cashing in on Cable Warning Flags for Local Government, October 2001, The Beacon Hill Institute of Suffolk University

See also 

 Administrative divisions of Massachusetts
 List of counties in Massachusetts
 List of cities in Massachusetts
 List of towns in Massachusetts
 List of villages in Massachusetts
 List of United States wireless communications service providers
 Cable television in the United States
 List of multiple-system operators
 List of United States over-the-air television networks
 List of United States cable and satellite television networks
 Satellite television in the United States
 List of communities served by Comcast (Largest cable provider in America)

References

External links 
 Massachusetts City and Town Directory, Secretary of the Commonwealth, Elections Division
 U.S. Community Network Maps

 
Communications in Massachusetts
Massachusetts geography-related lists
Science and technology in Massachusetts